The Liber epigrammatum is a collection of Latin epigrammatic poems composed by the Northumbrian monk Bede (d. 735). The modern title comes from a list of his works at the end of his Historia ecclesiastica gentis Anglorum (V.24.2): "librum epigrammatum heroico metro siue elegiaco" ("a book of epigrams in the heroic or elegiac meter").

Attestation and contents 
Although the collection no longer survives complete, much of its content has been reconstructed by Michael Lapidge from scattered attestations of appropriate verse attributed to Bede. Within decades of Bede's death, the Liber epigrammatum had been partly incorporated into a "sylloge" ("collection") of similar verse by Milred of Worcester (d. 774/75). While all that survives of Milred's sylloge is a single medieval manuscript fragment (Urbana, University of Illinois Library, 128, copied in the mid-tenth-century, perhaps at Worcester), that manuscript was seen in a more complete form by the antiquary John Leland, whose notes on its contents survive. Other poetry by Bede that could plausibly have been included in the Liber epigrammatum was transmitted by other medieval anthologists. In the estimation of Michael Lapidge,
in the end, it was probably the very disparate nature of the contents of the Liber epigrammatum—tituli, epitaphs, prayers, psalm paraphrases, etc.—which invited individual compilers to select individual items from the collection rather than to make the effort to copy the collection entire; and that, presumably, is why the Liber epigrammatum has not come down to us intact.In Lapidge's reconstruction (and following the order of his edition), the collection included the following works, which survive in whole or in part:

Aenigmata 

A significant work of the Liber epigrammatum is nineteen "aenigmata" ("riddles, enigmas"), which survive only in Cambridge, Cambridge University Library Gg.5.35 (fols 418v-419r), a manuscript otherwise noted for containing the Carmina cantabrigensia, but also containing collections of Latin riddles by Symphosius, Boniface, Aldhelm, Tatwine, and Eusebius. Although Frederick Tupper doubted the attribution to Bede, Lapidge has found that metrical and grammatical infelicities in the material can be explained by scribal transmission following composition, and that the works plausibly belong to Bede. The riddles are accompanied by an extensive commentary.

In Tupper's estimation, 'the essential unlikeness of the enigmas of the Cambridge MS to those that we meet elsewhere proclaims their author's originality as truly as the inadequate diction, awkward syntax, incorrect grammar, and halting meter attest his literary limitations'. Lapidge edited the riddles as one thirty-two-line poem:

Examples
Most of Bede's aenigmata are logogriphs, for example 11 (line 15), "Peruersus bonus est, breuitati si caput absit" ("something perverse is good, if its beginning is absent through abbreviation"). The solution to this riddle is that if one removes the first syllable from the word peruersus ("corrupted, perverse") one gets the word uersus, which means "changes" (and also "a line of poetry"). A few are true riddles, however, including 17 (lines 24-27):

As glossed by Lapidge,
the "guest from the sea" is apparently a whale (CETE); its blubber provides oil for lamps and lighting (illustrate tenebrans); no other sea-creature feeds off it, but its flesh feeds an entire population; although it perishes through the skill of a single whaler, that whaler could not consume it by himself: indeed the whale could not be consumed in a single day.

Editions 
 Frederick Tupper, Jr., 'Riddles of the Bede Tradition', Modern Philology, 2 (1905), 561-72.
 Michael Lapidge, ed. and tr. Bede's Latin Poetry. Oxford Medieval Texts. Oxford: Clarendon Press, 2019. .

References 

Latin texts of Anglo-Saxon England
Works by Bede
8th-century Latin books
Riddles
Latin poetry